Wayne Hutchinson is an Irish sportsperson. He plays hurling with his local club Ballygunner and has been a member of the Waterford senior inter-county team since 2011, making his Championship debut against Limerick on 12 June 2011, starting at full back.

References

Living people
Ballygunner hurlers
Waterford inter-county hurlers
Year of birth missing (living people)